Kenora Water Aerodrome  is located adjacent to Kenora, Ontario, Canada.

The airport is classified as an airport of entry by Nav Canada and is staffed by the Canada Border Services Agency (CBSA). CBSA officers at this airport can handle general aviation aircraft only, with no more than 15 passengers.

See also
 Kenora Airport

References

Transport in Kenora
Registered aerodromes in Kenora District
Seaplane bases in Ontario